= Statsminister =

Statsminister is a Danish, Norwegian and Swedish word meaning "prime minister" (literally "minister of state"). It is used as an official title for the following heads of government:

- Prime Minister of Denmark
- Prime Minister of Finland
- Prime Minister of Norway
- Prime Minister of Sweden
